The 1973 Yugoslav Cup was the 26th season of the top football knockout competition in SFR Yugoslavia, the Yugoslav Cup, also known as the "Marshal Tito Cup" (Kup Maršala Tita), since its establishment in 1946.

Calendar
The Yugoslav Cup was a tournament for which clubs from all tiers of the football pyramid were eligible to enter. In addition, amateur teams put together by individual Yugoslav People's Army garrisons and various factories and industrial plants were also encouraged to enter, which meant that each cup edition could have several thousands of teams in its preliminary stages. These teams would play through a number of qualifying rounds before reaching the first round proper, in which they would be paired with top-flight teams.

Unlike most cup finals played since the late 1950s which had been traditionally scheduled to coincide with the end of the football league season and Youth Day celebrated on 25 May (a national holiday in Yugoslavia which also doubled as the official commemoration of Josip Broz Tito's birthday), the 1973 and 1974 cups were played over only four months, with finals played in November in capital Belgrade, to coincide with Republic Day on 29 November.

Since the final was always meant to be determined on or around a national holiday at the JNA Stadium in capital Belgrade, and to avoid unfair advantage this would give to Belgrade-based clubs, the Football Association of Yugoslavia adopted the rule in the late 1960s which said that the final could be played as a one-legged tie (in cases when both finalists are from outside Belgrade) or double-legged (when at least one of them is based the capital), with the second leg always played in Belgrade. This rule was used for all eight cup finals involving Belgrade clubs played from 1970 to 1985.

First round
In the following tables winning teams are marked in bold; teams from outside top level are marked in italic script.

Second round

Quarter-finals

Semi-finals

Final

First leg

Second leg

See also
1973–74 Yugoslav First League
1973–74 Yugoslav Second League

External links
1973 Yugoslav Cup details at Rec.Sport.Soccer Statistics Foundation

Yugoslav Cup seasons
Cup
Yugo